José Carlos de Almeida, best known as Zé Carlos (born 14 November 1968 in Presidente Bernardes, São Paulo State) is a Brazilian former association footballer who played as a defender.

He started his career in 1990, and played for São José, Nacional, São Caetano, Portuguesa, União São João, São Paulo, Juventude, Matonense, Ponte Preta, Grêmio and Joinville.

He last played for Portuguesa in 2005 until May.

International career
Zé Carlos was called up for the Brazilian squad for the 1998 FIFA World Cup despite having never even been named for the senior squad, replacing Flávio Conceição. He played his sole national match in the 1998 FIFA World Cup semifinal match against Netherlands since Cafu was suspended.

References

External links
 Zé Carlos at playmakerstats.com (English version of ogol.com.br)

1968 births
Living people
Brazilian footballers
Brazil international footballers
São José Esporte Clube players
Nacional Atlético Clube (SP) players
Associação Desportiva São Caetano players
Associação Portuguesa de Desportos players
União São João Esporte Clube players
São Paulo FC players
Esporte Clube Juventude players
Associação Atlética Ponte Preta players
Grêmio Foot-Ball Porto Alegrense players
Joinville Esporte Clube players
1998 FIFA World Cup players
Association football midfielders